Pannjärv is a lake in the northeast of Estonia, close to the border with Russia.

See also
List of lakes of Estonia

Lakes of Estonia
Alutaguse Parish
Lakes of Ida-Viru County